The Cross Insurance Center is a 5,800-seat multi-purpose arena in Bangor, Maine, United States. The arena holds up to 8,500 people for concerts, and features an attached 2,000-person convention center. It was built at an estimated cost of $65 million. Part of the city's Bass Park complex, it is located across from Hollywood Casino Bangor. It is the home of the basketball teams of the Maine Black Bears.

History

The Bangor Auditorium was a 5,948-seat multipurpose arena located in downtown Bangor. It became a statewide icon by hosting the Maine Principals' Association basketball tournament each February, which is broadcast by the Maine Public Broadcasting Network.

Beginning sometime in the late 2000s, the city began discussing replacing the arena. In May 2011, the city held a public referendum in which voters supported building new facilities to replace the Auditorium and Civic Center by a margin of 3 to 1.

Demolition began at the Bangor Auditorium and Civic Center on June 3, 2013, with the new arena completed.
 
The facility is managed by Spectra, a division of Comcast. On July 20, 2012, it was announced that Cross Insurance Agency had purchased naming rights to the arena (previously referred to only as "Bangor Arena") for $3 million.

On July 31, 2013, the University of Maine announced that the Maine Black Bears basketball teams would play "over half" of their games at the new arena.

Noted performers
The Band Perry
John Fogerty
Brantley Gilbert
Mannheim Steamroller
Megadeth
Brad Paisley
Queens of the Stone Age
Bob Seger
Ringo Starr
Mötley Crüe
James Taylor
Frankie Valli
Elton John
Brian Wilson

Events
 UFC Fight Night: Bader vs. Saint Preux

See also
Alfond Arena at the University of Maine in nearby Orono

References

External links

Sports in Bangor, Maine
Indoor arenas in Maine
Convention centers in Maine
Basketball venues in Maine
Sports venues completed in 2013
Maine Black Bears basketball venues
2013 establishments in Maine
Buildings and structures in Bangor, Maine
Sports venues in Penobscot County, Maine